The East African snake-eyed skink or African coral rag skink (Cryptoblepharus africanus) is a species of lizard in the family Scincidae. It is found in eastern Africa.

References

Cryptoblepharus
Reptiles described in 1918
Taxa named by Richard Sternfeld